Rodolphe Elmira (born 12 October 1962) is a retired French football midfielder.

References

1962 births
Living people
Martiniquais footballers
French footballers
Ligue 2 players
Swiss Super League players
Grenoble Foot 38 players
Le Mans FC players
Bourges 18 players
Étoile Carouge FC players
Association football midfielders
French expatriate footballers
Expatriate footballers in Switzerland
French expatriate sportspeople in Switzerland